Kang Mi-na (born December 4, 1999), known mononymously as Mina, is a South Korean singer, rapper and actress signed under Jellyfish Entertainment. She is best known for finishing ninth in Mnet's K-pop girl group survival show Produce 101. She is a former member of the girl groups I.O.I and Gugudan, as well as its subgroups 5959 and SeMiNa. Kang is also best known for her roles in the television series Dokgo Rewind (2018), Tale of Fairy (2018), Hotel del Luna (2019), Summer Guys (2021), Moonshine (2021–2022), and  Café Minamdang (2022).

Early life

Kang Mi-na was born in Icheon, and later moved to Jeju City when she was eight years old. She graduated from School of Performing Arts Seoul in 2018.

Career

2016–2017: Produce 101, I.O.I and Gugudan

In January 2016, Kang, together with fellow trainees Kim Na-young and Kim Se-jeong, represented Jellyfish Entertainment on reality girl group survival show Produce 101 for the chance to debut in a Mnet girl group.

The program came to an end on April 1, 2016, and the final line-up of South Korean girl group I.O.I was announced, made up of the top 11 poll-winners. Kang finished ninth overall, with 173,762 votes, becoming an official member of the girl group.

On June 10, 2016, YMC Entertainment revealed that Kang would not be taking part in I.O.I's unit promotions, but would instead return to her agency to debut and promote with upcoming South Korean girl group, Gugudan.

In July 2017, a Gugudan subgroup named Gugudan 5959 was formed with Kang and fellow member Hye-yeon. They debuted with the single "Ice Chu" on August 10, 2017.

In June 2018, a Gugudan subgroup named Gugudan SeMiNa was formed with Kang and members Sejeong and Nayoung. They debuted with the release of their self-titled single album on July 10, 2018.

2018–present: Acting career
Kang made her acting debut in the MBC romantic comedy series Children of the 20th Century in 2017, playing the younger counterpart of Han Ye-seul's character. The same year, she played her first lead role in the 2-episode tvN drama History of Walking Upright.

In 2018, Kang began hosting the music program Show! Music Core. She then starred in the action web film Dokgo Rewind alongside Sehun of Exo, and played a supporting role in tvN fantasy romance drama Tale of Fairy.

In March 2019, Kang was confirmed as part of the cast for Law of the Jungle in Thailand. The same year, Kang played Kim Yuna in tvN fantasy drama Hotel del Luna.

In 2021, Kang was cast in the web drama Summer Guys which premiered on March 30. In June 2021, Kang made a cameo appearance in tvN fantasy-romance drama My Roommate Is A Gumiho. Later the same year, she starred in the KBS2 historical drama Moonshine as Han Ae-jin, the only daughter of a noble family. In 2022, she was cast in Café Minamdang as Nam Hye-joon.

Discography

Singles

Filmography

Film

Television series

Web series

Television shows

Awards and nominations

Notes

References

External links 

 Kang Mi-na at Jellyfish
 

1999 births
Living people
People from Icheon
Jellyfish Entertainment artists
Swing Entertainment artists
South Korean pop singers
South Korean female idols
South Korean film actresses
Produce 101 contestants
I.O.I members
South Korean television actresses
21st-century South Korean singers
21st-century South Korean actresses
21st-century South Korean women singers
School of Performing Arts Seoul alumni